WMMS (100.7 FM) is a commercial radio station licensed to Cleveland, Ohio, serving Greater Cleveland and much of surrounding Northeast Ohio, commonly identified as "The Buzzard". Widely regarded as one of the most influential rock stations in America throughout its history, the station has also drawn controversy for unusually aggressive tactics both on and off the air. Owned by iHeartMedia, and broadcasting a mix of active rock and hot talk, WMMS is currently the flagship station for Rover's Morning Glory, the FM flagship for the Cavaliers AudioVerse and Cleveland Guardians Radio Network, the Cleveland affiliate for The House of Hair with Dee Snider and the home of radio personality Alan Cox.

Signing on in 1946 as the FM adjunct to WHK, the WMMS call letters were affixed in 1968 under Metromedia ownership, having stood for "MetroMedia Stereo" and meant as a compliment to the newly established progressive rock format, but have since taken on a variety of other meanings. Created in April 1974 as "an ironic twist on Cleveland's down-and-out reputation as a decaying Rust Belt city," the station's longtime promotional mascot has been an anthropomorphic "Buzzard" cartoon character. In 1981, Radio & Records identified "the malevolent feathered figure" as "the best-known station symbol in the country." "De-emphasized" in the fall of 2007, the scavenger was revived the following spring to coincide with the station's 40th anniversary and with the arrival of morning personality Rover.

Throughout the 1970s and 1980s, WMMS had a stable of personalities that remained fundamentally unchanged, attained a dominant market share in the local ratings and posted market record-high figures "never duplicated by any other Cleveland radio station since." WMMS played a key role in breaking several major acts in the U.S., including David Bowie, Rush, and Bruce Springsteen. Station employees went on to take director and executive-level positions in the recording industry, namely with labels RCA, Mercury, and Columbia. Considered "a true radio legend," WMMS DJ Kid Leo was chosen for Rolling Stone's "Heavy Hundred: The High and Mighty of the Music Industry" (1980) and named "The Best Disc Jockey in the Country" in a special 1987 issue of Playboy. Noted filmmakers, including Cameron Crowe (Almost Famous) and Paul Schrader (Light of Day), have called on both The Buzzard and its personnel while preparing for various rock-themed productions. WMMS was also a major driving force behind the successful campaign to bring the Rock and Roll Hall of Fame to Cleveland.

Rolling Stone named WMMS "Best Radio Station" (Large Market) nine straight years (1979–87) as part of the magazine's annual Readers' Poll, but the station admitted to stuffing the 1987 ballot following a February 1988 front-page story in The Plain Dealer exposing manipulation. Seven years later, members of the station's staff and management pleaded guilty to disrupting a national broadcast of The Howard Stern Show that originated via the local Stern affiliate, cross-town rival WNCX. A federal offense, the act nearly cost WMMS its broadcasting license. Owned by Malrite Communications from 1972 to 1993, subsequent consolidation in the radio industry saw WMMS change ownership five times in seven years, and has been in iHeartMedia's portfolio (originally under the Clear Channel name) since 1999.

WMMS's studios are located at the Six Six Eight Building in downtown Cleveland's Gateway District; the station transmitter resides in neighboring Seven Hills. In addition to a standard analog transmission, WMMS broadcasts over two HD Radio channels and is available online via iHeartRadio. WMMS-HD2, which relays its signal over low-power FM translator W256BT, is the Cleveland affiliate for iHeart's all-news oriented Black Information Network.

History

Early years/WHK-FM
On March 30, 1946, radio station WHK – owned at that time by United Broadcasting Company, a subsidiary of Forest City Publishing, itself the parent company of The Plain Dealer – launched an experimental FM station under the callsign W8XUB at 107.1 megahertz (MHz). On July 31, 1947, W8XUB began broadcasting at 100.7 MHz. On November 13, 1947, the new FM station transitioned from experimental to commercial status; increased its power; and changed its callsign to WHKX.
On November 11, 1948, the station adopted the callsign WHK-FM. In 1958, both WHK and WHK-FM were sold to Metropolitan Broadcasting, itself renamed MetroMedia two years later. Like most early FM stations, WHK-FM mostly simulcast the Top 40 programming of its AM sister station. In 1966, in an effort to make the medium more commercially viable, the U.S. Federal Communications Commission (FCC) mandated that FM stations could no longer duplicate the programming of their AM sister stations. Seeing a small but significant groundswell of support for the medium in the market, WHK-FM adopted a new progressive rock format on August 15, 1968. WHK-FM became one of a handful of commercial stations in the country to try that format, many of which were owned by MetroMedia. In order to firmly establish a separate identity, and to reflect the station's ownership, the WHK-FM callsign was changed to WMMS on September 28, 1968.

Progressive rock (1968–1973)

MetroMedia found major success with progressive rock at KMET Los Angeles, KSAN San Francisco, WMMR Philadelphia and WNEW-FM New York, but a lack of commitment from MetroMedia led the company to drop the format at WMMS by May 1969. The station first turned to adult contemporary, big band, the Drake-Chenault automated Hit Parade '69 and finally Top 40,.

Following a legal dispute with a competing station owner over non-compete clauses in their contracts, former Top 40 WIXY personalities Dick  Kemp and Lou "King" Kirby were signed by MetroMedia for the top 40 format.  The top 40 format also failed to make any major ratings impact.  Soon after, the station revered back to the Progressive Rock format to battle WNCR of Nationwide Communications, itself filling the void created by the brief absence of WMMS on the album rock scene.  The top 40 deejays were retained, but it was soon obvious that they were inadequate hosts for a progressive rock format. Album deejay Denny Sanders was brought in from Boston and key WNCR personnel (including former WHK-FM/WMMS personalities Martin Perlich and Billy Bass, and station newcomer David Spero) were soon hired by WMMS, taking most of their audience with them. During this time, WMMS used slogans derived from its call sign: first as "Music Means Satisfaction", and later as the place "Where Music Means Something". Sounds described the station programming at this time as "totally off-the-wall in its choice of records, playing anything it liked. It's most famous for heavily plugging the MC5, The Velvets and The Dolls on one hand and science-art groups like Soft Machine and King Crimson on the other."

Under the leadership of station manager Billy Bass and program director Denny Sanders, WMMS helped break many new rock artists nationally, most notably David Bowie. Based on considerably high record sales in the Cleveland market, Bowie (in his Ziggy Stardust persona alongside The Spiders from Mars) kicked off his first U.S. tour in "The Rock Capital" (a term coined by Bass). The WMMS-sponsored concert was a "phenomenal success" and prompted the station to sponsor a second show that year. This second show sold out immediately, and was held at the city's largest venue: Cleveland Public Hall.

In November 1972, WMMS was sold to Malrite Communications, a Michigan-based firm that relocated to Cleveland upon purchase. Under Malrite ownership, WMMS would become an album-oriented rock (AOR) powerhouse, much in the same vein as its former MetroMedia progressive rock siblings.

Coffee Break Concerts
During this time, WMMS also began broadcasting a remarkable number of live concerts, many of which originated in Cleveland and were produced by the station itself. The WMMS Coffee Break Concert was a weekly music-interview show broadcast live from the station's studio, and later with an audience at the Agora Ballroom. Warren Zevon, John Mellencamp, Lou Reed, Tim Buckley, Peter Frampton, and a host of others performed on the program over the years, recordings of which are still widely available as bootlegs. The WMMS Coffee Break Concerts were booked and directed by Denny Sanders and hosted by Len "Boom" Goldberg, Debbie Ullman, and later, Matt the Cat. The concert series continued on well into the 1990s and early 2000s, albeit much less frequently.

Album-oriented rock (1973–94)

From "Find Me" to FM powerhouse

In July 1973, John Gorman joined WMMS as music director and was promoted to program director and operations manager two months later where he remained for thirteen years. During this time, with Denny Sanders as his creative services director and Rhonda Kiefer as programming assistant, WMMS broke all Cleveland ratings and revenue records. WMMS was the first radio station to employ full-time promotion and marketing directors: Dan Garfinkel and his successor, Jim Marchyshyn.

In time, the station adopted new slogans reflecting the callsign: "We're your Modern Music Station" and "your Music Marathon Station." Although never used on the air, listeners alternately knew the callsign as an acronym for "Weed Makes Me Smile" and "Magic MushroomS," the latter referencing the somewhat controversial logo used before the Buzzard.

Contrary to what many believe, the choice of the second Malrite logo had nothing to do with Buzzard Day, the annual "folksy event" held in Hinckley Township, Ohio. Rather, WMMS adopted a buzzard as its mascot in April 1974 because of the then tenuous economic state of Cleveland – less than five years away from becoming the first major American city to enter into default since the Great Depression – and the winged-creature's classification as a scavenger. In other words, the carrion-eating bird represented "death and dying" – a darkly comic reflection of the city's decline. EC horror comics, Fritz the Cat, Rocky and Bullwinkle, and Looney Tunes – all served as inspirations for the "bird of prey with attitude" concept. The station was known as "The Home of the Buzzard" at first.  was the co-creation of Gorman, Sanders and American Greetings artist David Helton.

A study conducted by MBA students at Case Western Reserve University in 1975 found that the new WMMS logo was more recognizable to those living in Greater Cleveland than both Chief Wahoo of the Cleveland Indians and even Coca-Cola.

From the onset, Helton's streamlined artwork resulted in an aggressive, yet family-friendly symbol for the station, one that continues to endure more than 40 years later. The Buzzard became synonymous with WMMS, Cleveland radio and the city itself, spawning a series of T-shirts so numerous that they are now impossible to catalog, many with slogans like "Where Music Means Something" and "Ruler of the Airwaves."

A major contributor to the ratings success was an airstaff that remained fundamentally unchanged for many years: personalities like Kid Leo, Jeff & Flash, Matt the Cat, Dia Stein, Denny Sanders, Murray Saul, Debbie Ullman, Betty "Crash" Korvan, Ruby Cheeks (Debra Luray), BLF Bash (Bill Freeman), TR (Tom Renzy) and the late Len "Boom" Goldberg were invaluable to the station's popularity. Of all the personalities that worked at WMMS, Len "Boom" Goldberg remained the longest. He joined the station in early 1972 before its sale to Malrite, and stayed in different capacities until 2004. He was best known as the voice for the station's hourly IDs, music segues, sweepers, and commercials, and was also a member of The Buzzard Morning Zoo in the mid-80s.

WMMS during this period would play a key role in breaking several major acts in the U.S., including: Rush, Roxy Music, Bruce Springsteen, Southside Johnny, Fleetwood Mac, Meat Loaf, The Pretenders, the New York Dolls, Lou Reed, Mott the Hoople, Boston, and The Sensational Alex Harvey Band. Of special note was the early support of Bruce Springsteen by Kid Leo and others, prior to the release of the Born to Run album. For the station's tenth anniversary in 1978, WMMS hosted and broadcast a live Springsteen concert at the Agora Ballroom independent of his concert tour. Heavily bootlegged, the concert further cemented the relationship between the two in fans' minds, and well into the 2000s Cleveland remains one of Springsteen's strongest bases. Right up until his departure in 1988, Kid Leo played "Born to Run" as his signature sign-off song every Friday night at 5:55 to kick off the weekend for area listeners.

World Series of Rock

The World Series of Rock was a recurring, day-long and usually multi-act summer rock concert held outdoors at Cleveland Municipal Stadium from 1974 through 1980. Belkin Productions staged these events, attracting popular hard rock bands and as many as 88,000 fans. WMMS sponsored the concerts. Attendance was by general admission. Concertgoers occasionally fell – or jumped – off the steep stadium upper deck onto the concrete seating area far below, causing serious injury. The Cleveland Free Clinic staffed aid stations in the stadium with physicians, nurses and other volunteers, and through 1977, made its treatment statistics public. From 1978 on, Belkin Productions conditioned its funding of the Free Clinic on the nondisclosure of the number of Clinic staff on duty at the concerts, the nature of conditions treated and the number of patients treated.

Rock Forty and the Rock Hall
WMMS was directly influenced by then and current sister station WHTZ/New York (Z100), which rose to the top of the ratings books immediately after installing a contemporary hit radio (CHR) format. Among the more significant moves taken by WMMS was the formatting of the morning zoo concept created by Z100's Scott Shannon onto the show Jeff & Flash (Jeff Kinzbach and Ed Ferenc) were already hosting. Kinzbach and Ferenc had already been a morning team – with sidekicks – since 1976, seven years prior to adopting the "morning zoo" label, so the basic structure was already in place.

The music structure also was modified at this time as artists such as Michael Jackson, Madonna and Prince soon found airplay on WMMS. The change was done for many reasons: as a nod to the sudden influence Z100's format had on the Malrite group; Gorman and Sanders intention to stay with the current music trends as the album-oriented rock (AOR) format was, even then, in a state of decline; and as a means to attract a female audience. By 1984, the WMMS format moved to an CHR/AOR hybrid, playing a great deal of Top 40 rock singles in hot rotation mixed with album cuts; this new blended rock/Top 40 format was soon known by those at the station as Rock Forty. The station also started to devote weekend programming to the classic rock format.

In the mid-1980s, WMMS was an important contributor in organizing a campaign (along with former Cleveland ad agency president Edward Spizel and author-deejay Norm N. Nite) which brought the Rock and Roll Hall of Fame to Cleveland. John Gorman, Denny Sanders and Kid Leo organized the original campaign with Tunc Erim, assistant to Atlantic Records president Ahmet Ertegun. Jeff & Flash were also credited as being major contributors in bringing the Rock Hall to Cleveland, by heavily promoting on-air a USA Today reader poll to decide which city should get it.

John Gorman and Denny Sanders left the station in fall of 1986, leading fourteen staff members with them to start rival station WNCX. Gorman credits his decision to leave to changes in management, and the station's overall shift to a more "corporate" mentality.

Rolling Stone Readers' Poll
Rolling Stone named WMMS "Radio Station of the Year" nine straight years (1979–87) as part of its annual Readers' Poll, but a February 1988 front-page story in The Plain Dealer revealed station employees had stuffed the annual survey's ballot box for the 1987 poll to allow for the possibility of a tenth straight win the following year. Lonnie Gronek, then general manager of the station, claimed in The Plain Dealer article that the process had gone on "for years", however other accounts dispute Gronek's claim.

The station claimed it was simply "a marketing strategy" and "much in line with what many stations did." Negative reaction was swift and widespread; some called the scheme a mere "lack of judgement," while a reporter for the Akron Beacon Journal compared the station's response to that of discredited former Vice-president Spiro Agnew.

Changing times
By the late 1980s, most of the original staff members had departed: John Gorman and Denny Sanders left in 1986 to launch upstart station WNCX, and Columbia Records hired Kid Leo in 1988. Four different program directors, including Rich Piombino and Michael Luczak, came and went with varying levels of success. DJ additions included station engineer Ric Bennett as "Rocco the Rock Dog," Scooter (WMMS music director Brad Hanson), former WRQC nighttime Personality and later WNCX Afternoon Drive and Production Director, Tom "Jack" Daniels (who returned to the Cleveland airwaves after a successful stint as Program Director of WLEV, Allentown, PA), Lisa Dillon and station veteran Matt the Cat, (who returned to the midday slot in 1990 after a two-year absence.) However, Matt would be dismissed permanently from the station in late 1992, the victim of budget cuts.

Ratings steadily increased during the time of the First Gulf War, but The Howard Stern Show was soon picked up by a then struggling WNCX. Stern's ratings exploded and this – along with a growing urgency from management not to compete with or mention Stern on the air – led to a sudden and steep ratings decline for The Buzzard Morning Zoo. Matt the Cat was permanently let go in December 1992 due to "budget problems." From 1991 to 1993, WMMS served as the FM flagship for the Cleveland Browns, sharing coverage with then-sister WHK; the late Nev Chandler served as play-by-play announcer. Unable to service its growing debt, Malrite chose to leave radio and sold off all its remaining properties in 1993: WMMS went to Shamrock Broadcasting, the Roy Disney broadcasting firm. Management ordered a change to the Buzzard by giving it a flat-top and mullet.

The station continued to decline during the ownership transition from Malrite to Shamrock; then Shamrock sold both WMMS and WHK to OmniAmerica, a broadcasting company run by former Malrite executives Carl Hirsch and Dean Thacker, which already owned oldies station WMJI. WMMS' decline culminated on April 14, 1994, with the high-profile departure of Jeff Kinzbach, effectively ending "Jeff & Flash" on WMMS (Ferenc would leave the station several weeks later; both would pair up again at WWWE). Lisa Dillon, Ric Bennett and Tom Renzy also would depart the station that same day.

The Cleveland Funeral
Among the most notorious broadcasts of The Howard Stern Show occurred on June 10, 1994. Stern had arrived on the Cleveland airwaves less than two years earlier, and in that time took his syndicated program on rival WNCX from an Arbitron ranking of thirteen to number one. As promised, Stern held a party for his fans on the streets of Cleveland – a "Funeral" for his local rivals, much like similar events held in New York, Los Angeles and Philadelphia – and broadcast it nationwide.

During the now infamous broadcast, WMMS engineer William Alford snipped a broadcast wire used for the Stern show's satellite feed. Stern continued on with the program over a phone line as engineers worked to quickly patch together the severed broadcast wire. Alford was subsequently caught, arrested and later sentenced to ten days in jail and a $1,000 fine. Station management initially claimed that Alford acted alone, however WMMS Promotions Director Heidi Klosterman—working under the name Heidi Kramer—later pleaded guilty to a felony charge of attempted disruption of a public service and a misdemeanor of receiving stolen property; Greg Smith, a former Klosterman colleague, pleaded guilty to a misdemeanor of breaking and entering.

Alternative rock (1994–97)

The Next Generation
Already program director at OmniAmerica station WMJI, station veteran John Gorman returned to WMMS as vice-president and director of operations in early 1994. Gorman changed the WMMS format to alternative rock, playing new acts like Nirvana, The Offspring, and Nine Inch Nails, on October 27. To emphasize this change, WMMS was re-branded and aggressively promoted as "Buzzard Radio: The Next Generation", a reference to the success of Star Trek: The Next Generation and its continuation of the Star Trek franchise. Gorman brought back the original Buzzard design, now drawn by David Helton's successor Brian Chalmers. WMMS also lured popular morning personalities Brian Fowler and Joe Cronauer away from rival WENZ—then also an alternative rock station—as the successors to Jeff and Flash (Jeff Kinzbach, Ed Ferenc) on The Buzzard Morning Zoo.

While the change in programming alienated many longtime listeners, many of whom switched to WNCX and their full-time classic rock format, WMMS boosted its ratings for the first time in years with a new, younger audience. Billboard and Airplay Monitor magazines together named WMMS Rock Station of the Year (Medium Market) in 1995, and Modern Rock Station of the Year (Medium Market) in 1996. John Gorman was named Program Director of the Year (Rock) in 1995. Despite signs of success, the stations were sold again in 1996: WMMS went to Nationwide Communications, while WHK went to Salem Communications. The sale came almost immediately after passage of the Telecommunications Act of 1996, a time when radio companies nationwide rushed "at a fever pitch" to acquire new properties. John Gorman, who has since openly criticized the industry's current state, departed for CBS Radio in Detroit, but soon moved to media consulting.

BuzzardFest
During this time, WMMS held a series of sold-out rock festivals that featured many of the new up-and-coming artists receiving station airplay. Buzzard-Palooza was the first of these: held in July 1994 at the Nautica Stage, the all-day concert included sets from Collective Soul, Junkhouse and Fury in the Slaughterhouse, but was cut short after turning into a "rock-and-bottle-throwing melee." Cleveland Police wearing riot gear were called in just as headliner Green Day took the stage. WMMS scheduled a second Green Day performance just two months later – this time at Blossom Music Center – and at a near-record-low cost of $5 per ticket, the station gave fans a "second chance" to see the band live. The Ramones headlined BuzzardFest '95 the following spring (May 1995) at Blossom; other acts included Our Lady Peace, The Rugburns and Face to Face. BuzzardFest II was held the very next fall (September 1995) – again at Blossom – and featured performances from the Goo Goo Dolls, Alanis Morissette, Jewel, as well as the Dance Hall Crashers, Eleven, Green Apple Quick Step, Prick and Sons of Elvis.

The next of these multi-act shows, simply titled BuzzardFest, was held in May 1996 at Blossom Music Center and featured performances from 311 and No Doubt, along with Candlebox, The Nixons, Goldfinger, Gods Child, Dash Rip Rock, Holy Barbarians, and Canadian rock band The Tragically Hip. BuzzardFest 2000 was held on June 30, 2000, at the Nautica Stage; Stone Temple Pilots, performing in Cleveland for the first time in six years, headlined the event.

Active rock (1997–present)

Deregulation and "Death of the Buzzard" 

WMMS shifted format to active rock on February 17, 1997, under the direction of Bob Neumann, who had previously programmed WNCX and WENZ. Neumann defended the decision later as the right thing to have done, noting how alternative rock would eventually fade as a format several years later. Meanwhile, ownership would change yet again as Nationwide Communications was bought out by Jacor in November 1997. The Jacor purchase closed on August 10, 1998;  later, on October 8, 1998, Clear Channel Communications won a bidding war for Jacor in a $6.5 billion deal. Closing in May 1999, Clear Channel was renamed iHeartMedia in 2014. WMMS veteran John Gorman has remained a vocal critic of iHeartMedia, once remarking on the company's former Cleveland executive, Kevin Metheny (dubbed "Pig Virus" by Howard Stern during their time at WNBC): "He had a volatile time here. People in radio say he was not an easy guy, that dealing with him was like a daily root canal." Studios were moved again to a combined facility in the suburb of Independence, Ohio.

Following Jacor's takeover, WMMS ran a "Death of the Buzzard" month-long stunt in October 1998. As part of the stunt, Denny Sanders returned to host an airshift, programming the music at his discretion. Geared as a format change to contemporary hit radio (CHR) using the "KISS FM" brand, the decision was reversed at the last minute by management. The fall 1998 Arbitron books showed WMMS with a substantial increase in listeners; Plain Dealer radio critic Roger Brown commented, "the scam worked" claiming it drove people to listen to the station again for what was supposedly the format's final days. A new airstaff was assembled after the stunt: Tim "Slats" Guinane was hired for afternoon drive replacing Brian & Joe, who were transferred to WMVX, and music director Mark Pennington replaced Bill "BLF Bash" Freeman in overnights. Seth "the Barbarian" Williams took the overnight shift when Pennington moved to evenings in 2001. WMMS again served as the FM flagship to the Cleveland Browns Radio Network from 2002 to 2012, with Jim Donovan and Doug Dieken as announcers. Radio & Records twice named WMMS "Rock Station of the Year: Markets 1-25" (2005–06) as part of the now defunct publication's annual Industry Achievement Awards.

In September 2007, WMMS management chose to "de-emphasize" both The Buzzard and WMMS call letters, referring to the station as simply "100.7", save for the FCC-mandated legal ID at the top of every hour. Regarding the change, WMMS program director Bo Matthews (Alex Gutierrez) said, "… nobody's killing anything... Chief Wahoo is not on every piece of Indians promotional material... Ronald McDonald is not in every McDonald's commercial... We're not losing the letters. All we're doing is shifting an image." By April 2008, the station had reverted to branding as The Buzzard but using a road sign-style logo similar to a U.S. Route shield in an allusion to the mascot.

Loveline, Westwood One's nationally syndicated call-in show hosted by Dr. Drew, aired weeknights from August 2008 through June 2010. "Chris Tyler" Merluzzo, former program director for Providence's WHJY, took over for Bo Matthews as WMMS program director on February 17, 2014. Following Merluzzo's departure, senior vice president of programming for iHeartMedia's North Ohio region Keith Abrams was named as program director on December 4, 2017. Former Lex and Terry producer Jason Carr was named the new WMMS assistant program director on February 1, 2018.

Morning troubles
From the 1994 exit of Jeff Kinzbach and Ed Ferenc until the arrival of Rover's Morning Glory in 2008, WMMS gained notoriety for airing 13 distinct shows in morning drive. Ross Brittain temporarily filled in prior to the arrival of The Brian and Joe Radio Show on the Buzzard Morning Zoo, hosted by Brian Fowler and Joe Cronauer. Brian and Joe were moved to afternoons in February 1997 after a change in ownership, with shock jock Liz Wilde (Anne Whittemore) from WPLL/Miami taking their place; her firing less than a year later sparked a successful lawsuit against both the station and then-owner Nationwide Communications. Danny Czekalinski and Darla Jaye teamed up in October 1997 with Liz Wilde holdover Cory Lingus (Cory Gallant) until August 1998. Matt Harris served in the interim until WMMS hired Dick Dale (Bert Morris) from WPLA/Jacksonville.

In 2000, the station turned to Wakin' up with Wolf and Mulrooney—hosted by Bob Wolf and John Mulrooney—from Albany's WPYX, which initially continued to originate and simulcast the program. The team did later relocate to Cleveland, but lasted only a few months until an acrimonious breakup between Wolf and Mulrooney. Other shows, like The Buzzard Morning Show with Rick and Megalis (Rick Eberhart, Tom Megalis) and WMMS Mornings with Sean, Cristi, and Hunter (Sean Kelly, Cristi Cantle, Hunter Scott), came and went in quick succession. Cantle later called the failure of Sean, Cristi and Hunter as "a real team effort" and compared herself unfavorably to Johnny Manziel: "too young, too overconfident and too drunk to handle the responsibility... however I have no intentions of playing Canadian football". Finally, The Bob & Tom Show aired in the time slot from 2006 until April 2008.

The Maxwell Show

Bo Matthews (Alex Gutierrez), who became the station's program director in early 2004, hired Ohio native Benjamin "Maxwell" Bornstein that April for a more "personality-driven" afternoon show following the departure of Tim "Slats" Guinane for WXTM. The Maxwell Show gradually evolved from airing mostly music to all talk, with Maxwell joined by WMMS music director Dan Stansbury and Tiffany "Chunk" Peck, the program's phone screener. Maxwell was known for having feuds with other radio personalities during the show's time at WMMS, including Rover of Rover's Morning Glory and fellow WTAM afternoon host Mike Trivisonno; by 2009, Maxwell had become the number one afternoon program in several key demographics.

On April 3, 2009, The Maxwell Show went on the air claiming that Metallica—in Cleveland for the 2009 Rock and Roll Hall of Fame induction ceremony the very next day—was playing a free show in the WMMS parking lot later that evening. Following the prank announcement, station management placed Maxwell on probation for 90 days. Already strained by ongoing contract renewal negotiations, the incident further alienated the two parties, and by November of that year the show was cancelled.

Rover's Morning Glory 

Radio personality Rover (Shane French), host of Rover's Morning Glory, took over weekday mornings at WMMS on April 1, 2008, following a contract dispute with WKRK-FM owner CBS Radio; John Gorman compared signing the popular morning personality to a "coup". Born in Chicago but raised in Las Vegas, Rover worked for rock stations KISW in Seattle and KXPK in Denver prior to arriving in Cleveland. Additionally, Rover was the Midwest replacement for Howard Stern under CBS's Free FM branding concept following Stern's move to Sirius Satellite Radio in 2006, originating from Chicago's WCKG. Rover's contract with CBS was set to expire, but it was an affiliate contract inherited from the Free FM stint—CBS transferred him back to WKRK-FM after WCKG cancelled it—and not a talent contract, thus he was not subject to a non-compete clause.

Co-hosts Duji (Susan Catanese) and Dominic Dieter each worked on Rover's Morning Glory before the move to WMMS; since then, the show has expanded to include sound engineer Chocolate Charlie (Mike Toomey), phone screener Mattitude/Flatitude (Matt Novick), Video Anthony Snitzer, Producer Dumb (Shaun Street) and former intern Jeffrey LaRocque. Past show members at WMMS include, Ryan Hoppe, Scott Taylor (now a reporter at WJLA in Washington, DC, Kaitlin Geosano, and Rob Garguilo. Past affiliates at WMMS include WAMX/Huntington, WMFS-FM/Memphis, WNDE/Indianapolis, WXEG/Dayton, WRXS/Columbus, and the now defunct Extreme Talk. The show is now syndicated to WKGB-FM/Binghamton, WRKK/Williamsport, and WZNE/Rochester; replays continuously on a dedicated iHeartRadio channel; is available on demand through iHeartRadio; and broadcasts over the Livestream video platform. WMMS itself also airs The Rover Rewind, a weekly recap show on Saturday mornings. Rover is under contract with WMMS through 2022.

Described by The Plain Dealer as "testosterone-fueled", the show dominates younger demographics, particularly male listeners ages 18–34. Cleveland Magazine has called the show a "juggernaut", and readers of Cleveland Scene named Rover the best Cleveland radio personality in 2009, 2014, and 2015 (Scene had previously recognized either Rover or his show four straight years, from 2004 to 2007, all prior to the move to WMMS). The broadcast consists entirely of talk, a mix of current events, pop culture, and stories from the staff. Regular segments include "The Shizzy", a daily news update; "Tech Tuesday", where listeners pose consumer electronics questions to an industry expert; and "The Thursday Hook-Up", a call-in dating game. Rover regularly takes calls throughout the show, and often interviews guests in studio and over the phone. Cleveland Police briefly detained Ky-Mani Marley after the singer threatened Rover for comments made during an April 20, 2010 in-studio interview. On October 26, 2010, Rover hired a witch doctor to curse LeBron James after the NBA star left the Cleveland Cavaliers.

The Alan Cox Show

Radio personality Alan Cox, formerly host of The Morning Fix at WKQX/Chicago and The Alan Cox Radio Show at WXDX-FM/Pittsburgh, took over weekday afternoons as host of The Alan Cox Show on December 16, 2009. Joining the Chicago native are Cleveland area comedians Bill Squire and Mary Santora, and former intern-turned-phone-screener Cody (Poundcake) Brown. Described by Talkers magazine as "a bold anomaly worthy of industry attention", the show itself has successfully continued the format established by its predecessor The Maxwell Show – all talk during afternoon drive on an FM rock station. The Alan Cox Show is rated #1 in several key demographics, and readers of Cleveland Scene named Alan Cox the best Cleveland radio personality four straight years (2010–13). In addition to the live broadcast, the show is available on demand through iHeartRadio; and can be downloaded as a podcast through iTunes. WMMS also airs The Week in Cox, a weekly recap show on Sunday mornings.

A devoted fan of heavy metal, Cox considers himself more of a comedian than a disc jockey. The show itself rapidly covers a range of topics in a comedic format, from major current events to obscure pop culture; regular segments like "Sperm News", "Why Florida Sucks", and "Are You Smarter Than a Dumbass?" typify the show's irreverent style. Cox also frequently takes calls from listeners, and often interviews guests in studio and over the phone. During a June 19, 2012 interview with Aerosmith frontman Steven Tyler, the show broke news of the delayed release for Music from Another Dimension!, the band's first studio album in eight years. On February 9, 2010, the show aired "Parma State of Mind", both a parody of the Jay-Z/Alicia Keys hit "Empire State of Mind" and a way of continuing the Northeast Ohio tradition of poking fun at the Cleveland suburb. Dean DePiero, then mayor of Parma, criticized the song and its accompanying YouTube video: "It's pretty sick. ... The people who put it together aren't even smart enough to know where our city boundaries are." The show also drew national attention after holding a book burning party for Fifty Shades of Grey on July 8, 2012.

Comedian Chad Zumock was a co-host until his dismissal on December 3, 2012, after being arrested for driving while intoxicated; Zumock was acquitted of the charge on May 3, 2013.

Studio and transmitter locations

Current programming

WMMS's program lineup currently features Rover's Mornings Glory in morning drive, Dan Stansbury middays, The Alan Cox Show in afternoon drive and Corey Rotic evenings. The station serves as the FM flagship for both the Cleveland Cavaliers and Cleveland Guardians radio networks. While both Rover and Alan Cox are primarily "hot talk" programs, rock music airs during regular middays, nights, overnights, weekends and online during Cavaliers and Guardians play-by-play. Cleveland Magazine has also described both Rover and Cox as "talk shows with a rock-oriented sensibility". All other air talent heard on WMMS is provided via iHeartMedia's "Premium Choice" voice-tracking service. The House of Hair with Dee Snider also airs on Sunday evenings. The station hosts two additional HD Radio subchannels: WMMS-HD2 is the Cleveland affiliate for the Black Information Network, 
WMMS airs regular traffic and weather updates via the Total Traffic and Weather Network and former sister station WOIO (TV channel 19), and the station satisfies U.S. Federal Communications Commission-mandated public affairs programming on Sunday mornings with the City Club of Cleveland's Friday Forum. Most station imaging is produced out-of-market by national voice talents "David Lee" Olejniczak, Malcolm Ryker, Rena-Marie Villano, and former WMMS creative services director Miles Hlivko; additional voice-over audio is produced on-site by WMMS imaging director Billy Black. WMMS also transmits text to compatible analog receivers, such as station IDs and artist and song information, via the Radio Data System (RDS); similarly, WMMS transmits text to HD Radio receivers known as Program Service Data (PSD).

Play-by-play
WMMS has served as the FM flagship station for the Cleveland Cavaliers AudioVerse since 2014, sharing network flagship status with AM sister station WTAM. On-site, play-by-play announcer Tim Alcorn calls games alongside color analyst Jim Chones, a former Cavaliers center. In studio, WTAM sports director Mike Snyder hosts The Tip-Off Show, The Halftime Report, and The Nightcap Recap – the network pregame, halftime, and postgame shows, respectively. WMMS does not air additional network programming. Play-by-play itself is also limited to over-the-air FM; due to league restrictions, the WMMS webcast on iHeartRadio does not stream play-by-play coverage online.

WMMS has also served as the FM flagship station for the Cleveland Guardians Radio Network since 2013, again sharing network flagship status with AM sister station WTAM. Play-by-play announcers Tom Hamilton and Jim Rosenhaus call games on-site. Rosenhaus hosts the network pregame show; and Hamilton hosts the network postgame show. WMMS does not air additional network programming, and the station only airs select games during spring training. WMMS also streams it's coverage of selected games on iHeartRadio, even outside of the Cleveland market.

Notes

References

Bibliography

Documentaries

External links

1946 establishments in Ohio
Active rock radio stations in the United States
IHeartMedia radio stations
Metromedia
Nationwide Communications
Radio stations established in 1946
MMS
Articles which contain graphical timelines